Rashon Burno (born February 3, 1978) is an American basketball coach who is the head coach of the Northern Illinois Huskies men's basketball team.

Playing career
Burno played at St. Anthony High School in New Jersey under Bob Hurley, where he was a part of two national championship teams his junior and senior years. He played collegiately at DePaul under Pat Kennedy and was part of the Blue Demons' 2000 NCAA tournament squad.

Coaching career
Burno got his coaching start as the head basketball coach at Marmion Academy from 2007 to 2010 where he also served as an economics and physical education teacher before landing his first college coaching job as an assistant at Towson, reuniting with his college head coach Kennedy. He'd then move on to assistant coaching stops at Manhattan, and then four years under Billy Donovan at Florida from 2012 to 2015, where he was part of three Elite Eight teams and the 2014 NCAA Final Four team. In 2015, he joined Bobby Hurley's staff at Arizona State.

On March 6, 2021, Burno was named the 29th head coach in Northern Illinois history, replacing Mark Montgomery.

Head coaching record

References

1978 births
Living people
American men's basketball coaches
Northern Illinois Huskies men's basketball coaches
Towson Tigers men's basketball coaches
Manhattan Jaspers basketball coaches
Florida Gators men's basketball coaches
Arizona State Sun Devils men's basketball coaches
DePaul Blue Demons men's basketball players
Basketball players from Jersey City, New Jersey
Sportspeople from Jersey City, New Jersey
St. Anthony High School (New Jersey) alumni
Basketball coaches from New Jersey